The Virginia Graeme Baker Pool and Spa Safety Act (VGBA) is a United States law named after Virginia Graeme Baker, who died after sustaining a pool suction-drain injury in June 2002, when the suction from a spa drain entrapped her under the water. It is incorporated as Title 14 of the U.S. Energy Independence and Security Act of 2007 (EISA Title 14, Pub.L. 110-140). This act became enforceable law on December 19, 2008.

Goals
The goals of the VGBA were to enhance the safety of public and private pools and spas, to reduce child drownings, to reduce the number of suction entrapment incidents, injuries and deaths; and to educate the public on the importance of constant supervision of children in and around water.

Virginia Graeme Baker 

Virginia Graeme Baker was a seven-year-old girl who drowned when she was trapped underwater by the powerful suction of a hot tub drain. She was simply called "Graeme" and was the second youngest of five daughters including a twin. She was a proficient swimmer for her age and had been able to swim on her own since the age of three. Additionally, she was a member of her community swim and dive team. Her parents were Nancy and James Baker IV. James Baker is the son of former Secretary of State James Baker III.

In June 2002, Graeme was stuck to a hot tub drain by suction. Efforts by her mother to free her were unsuccessful and when two men eventually were able to free her (postmortem), the drain broke from the force. Although Graeme drowned, her official cause of death was "suction entrapment due to a faulty drain cover". Following Graeme's death in June 2002, her mother, Nancy Baker, began work to advocate pool and spa safety. She began lobbying Congress to pass legislation to require anti-entrapment drain covers as well as other pool and spa safety devices. EISA was introduced to Congress on January 12, 2007 and signed into law on December 19, 2007 by President George W. Bush.

Death of Abigail Taylor 

Abigail Rose Taylor was a young girl from Edina, Minnesota, whose accidental injury and eventual death led to federal legislation to improve the safety of swimming pools.

On June 29, 2007, six-year-old Abigail's parents took her to the Minneapolis Golf Club in St. Louis Park, Minnesota. Abigail accidentally fell on the open drain of the pool and her buttocks were sucked into the aperture. The suction dislodged a large section of her small intestine, which was forcefully drawn out through the anus, a phenomenon known as transanal evisceration. Abigail lost 6.5 meters (21 feet) of her small intestine in the accident, leaving her with short bowel syndrome. Abigail was hospitalized and received a rare triple organ transplant to replace her small intestine, liver, and pancreas, all of which were damaged in the accident. She was unable to eat or drink, and she required total parenteral nutrition. Abigail died nine months after the accident because of a transplant-related cancer.

The incident was similar to a 1993 incident in North Carolina involving Valerie Lakey. The pool drains in question in both the Taylor and the Lakey cases were manufactured by Sta-Rite, a division of Minnesota-based Pentair. Lakey received a $25 million settlement with the help of lawyer (and later Senator) John Edwards.

Entrapment
Consumer Product Safety Commission staff began investigating reported incidents of swimming pool/spa suction entrapment incidents in the 1970s. Such incidents included entrapment of hair, body, limb, evisceration or disembowelment and mechanical entrapment of jewelry or bathing suits. From 1999 to 2007 for all age categories records were examined. In 2007, for all age categories, there were 74 reports of circulation entrapments. Individuals in the 5- to 9-year-old category had the highest frequency of entrapment reports.

Pool/spa accident statistics
Between January 1985 and March 2002, there were 147 confirmed, recorded suction-entrapment incidents, according to Consumer Product Safety Commission records. 51 of those were hair entanglement, 79 body or limb entrapments (including three eviscerations), four mechanical (jewelry, etc) and 13 unknown. Of the 147 incidents, 36 resulted in deaths. While the first documented case is unclear, lawyer John Edwards points to a case in 1974.

According to the National Safety Council (NSC), 172 children under the age of 15 drowned in pools or spas between Memorial Day and Labor Day in 2010. An additional 180 children under the age of 15 were injured. The NSC is further calling for increased vigilance by parents and pool/spa owners. They suggest precautions such as four-sided fences for pool/spa areas, alarms on all doors accessing pool/spa areas, heavy duty pool covers, anti-entrapment drains and close supervision of children near pools/spas.

Drain provisions
A drain is defined as a plumbing fitting installed on the suction side of a pump in a pool, spa or hot tub. Drains are now required to be "unblockable." This term has previously been defined in the "definitions" section. Four main ways of keeping a drain from being blockable are outlined as: large aspect covers; long channels; large outlet grates; and circulation designs that do not include fully submerged suction outlets. In the United States, if a pool or spa does not employ an unblockable drain, it must include, at a minimum, one of the following safety systems: a safety vacuum-release system (SVRS) as defined in "definitions;" a suction-limiting vent system with a tamper-resistant atmospheric opening; a gravity drainage system that utilizes a collector tank; an automatic pump shut-off system; a device or system that disables the drain or any other system certified by the consumer product safety commission.

Legal status

Definitions from EISA
There are 7 definitions given under title XIV of EISA 2007.

The following definitions are directly quoted out of EISA 2007:

(1) ASME/ANSI — The term 'ASME/ANSI' as applied to a safety standard means such a standard that is accredited by the American National Standards Institute and published by the American Society of Mechanical Engineers.

(2) Barrier — The term 'barrier' includes a natural or constructed topographical feature that prevents unpermitted access by children to a swimming pool, and, with respect to a hot tub, a lockable cover.

(3) Commission — The term 'Commission' means the Consumer Product Safety Commission.

(4) Main Drain — The term 'main drain' means a submerged suction outlet typically located at the bottom of a pool or spa to conduct water to a recirculating pump.

(5) Safety Vacuum Release System (SVRS) - The term 'safety vacuum release system' means a vacuum release system capable of providing vacuum release at a suction outlet caused by a high vacuum occurrence due to a suction outlet flow blockage.

(6) Swimming Pool; Spa — The term 'swimming pool' or 'spa' means any outdoor or indoor structure intended for swimming or recreational bathing, including in-ground and above-ground structures, and includes hot tubs, spas, portable spas, and non-portable wading pools.

(7) Unblockable Drain — The term 'unblockable drain' means a drain of any size and shape that a human body cannot sufficiently block to create a suction entrapment hazard.

Sponsors of the bill

House: Debbie Wasserman Schultz

Senate: introduced by Mark Pryor, D-Ark., Ted Stevens, R-Alaska, and Chris Dodd, D-Conn. Amy Klobuchar, D-Minn., signed on as an original co-sponsor.

Federal requirements
There is a federal requirement for public pools that preempts the state or local law, as of December 19, 2008, and further regulations are in addition to it:

Sec. 1404: Top Priority for Public Pool And Spa Owners/Operators
All pool/spa drain covers manufactured, distributed or entered into commerce on or after December 19, 2008 must meet ASME/ANSI A112.19.8– 2007. All public pools and spas must be retrofitted with covers that meet the ASME/ANSI A112.19.8– 2007 standard. All public pools and spas that have a single drain other than an unblockable drain must employ one or more additional options.

State requirements
A pool contractor should verify that the pool and/or spa is in compliance with the federally mandated Virginia Graeme Baker Pool & Spa Safety Act which takes effect December 19, 2008.  If the pool is not in compliance, the necessary steps should be taken to comply with the Virginia Graeme Baker Pool & Spa Safety Act, that, in essence, specifies that:
All public pools and spas, both new and existing, shall be equipped with drain covers compliant with ASME/ANSI A112.19.8 2007 standard.

In addition, all public pools and spas with a single main drain other than an un-blockable drain, shall also employ one or more of the following devices: separated drain system per ANSI/APSP 7, safety vacuum release system (SVRS) that complies with ANSI/ASME A112.19.17 or ASTM F2387; suction-limiting vent system; gravity drainage system; automatic pump shutoff; drain disablement; equivalent system determined by the CPSC.

The definition of un-blockable drain in the Act is a "drain sump of any size or shape that a human body cannot sufficiently block to create a suction entrapment issue."

Link to the Act: Title XIV—Pool and Spa Safety Act

Compliant drain covers
The VGBA requires all drain covers to either be manufactured products or to be field fabricated outlets", in each case meeting the specific technical requirements of the act and having the necessary certification.

The PSSA requires a safe and secure connection between the cover and sump. A new, compliant cover that fits securely into a pre-existing sump is accepted under certain conditions.

SVRS devices
These are used in conjunction with an approved main drain cover and skimmer. SVRS are a type of device that are tested to respond to a full vacuum, stopping and releasing a vacuum within 4.5 seconds after a drain is fully blocked. These systems must be tested and certified to be in conformance with ANSI/PSPS/ICC-7-2013 “Manufactured Safety Vacuum Release Systems (SVRS) for Residential and Commercial Swimming Pool, Spa, Hot Tub, and Wading Pool Suction Systems” or ASTM F2387 “Standard Provisional Specification for Manufactured for Swimming Pools, Spas, and Hot Tubs.” These standards establish requirements for manufactured SVRS devices: the dimensions and tolerances, materials, installation instructions, testing requirements, and markings and identification. An SVRS can be installed as an independent system or Can be incorporated as part of the pool pump.

Mechanical devices which let air into pump to ease the vacuum when entrapment or blockage is sensed by device.
Electro-mechanical devices that shut off pump when blockage/entrapment is sensed.
Pumps or motors with built-in software that shuts off pump when blockage/entrapment is sensed.

Compliance
As of December 19, 2008, it became unlawful to manufacture for sale, offer for sale, distribute in commerce or import into the United States any pool/spa product that is not within conformity to the new pool/spa safety rule, 15 U.S.C. § 2068(a), or the new drain standards, ASME/ANSI A112.19.8.

Any person who knowingly manufactures, sells, distributes or imports a device of noncompliance shall face penalties up to the maximum of $1.825 million. Congress is considering raising this amount to $10 million per offense. Imprisonment is also allowed for this offense, however sentencing term guidelines are not outlined. Criminal and civil penalties could also ensue if any person knowingly does not report the practice of another manufacturing, selling, distributing or importing a noncompliance product.

Pools and spas that are not in operation on December 19, 2008 do not need to meet the new safety standards until they intend to reopen.

Sources

 CONSUMER PRODUCT SAFETY COMMISSION (http://WWW.CPSC.GOV/)
 CPSC Enforcement Position
 Presentation on Drowning Prevention, Entrapment Prevention & Pool and Spa Safety Act (pdf)
 CPSC Staff's Guide to Complying with the Law, October 2008 (pdf)
 CPSC Staff Interpretation of Section 1404 of the Virginia Graeme Baker Pool and Spa Safety Act, June 18, 2008 (pdf)
 CPSC Staff Draft Technical Guidance on Section 1406 on Minimum State Requirements for Grant Program* Public Comment Period
 ANSI/APSP-7 Fact Sheet
 ANSI/APSP-7 field checklist for identifying suction entrapment hazards

References

External links
Swimming-Pool-Information.com - Web page with more information on compliant devices
Full text version of EISA 2007: EISA 2007
PoolSafety.gov
Poolsafety.gov A staff interpretation of new drain standards. poolsafety.gov Interpretation
Virginia Graeme Baker's Story. Virginia Graeme Baker
Pool & Spa safe equipment. Equipment Specifications and Pictures
Pool/Spa operation FAQs. FAQs
information on alternative bottom drain technology

Safety codes
Consumer protection law
United States federal child welfare legislation
Acts of the 110th United States Congress
United States federal legislation articles without infoboxes
Consumer protection in the United States